Ivo Karlović defeated Arnaud Clément 3–6, 6–4, 6–4 to win the 2007 Nottingham Open singles event.

Seeds

Draw

Finals

Section 1

Section 2

External links
Singles draw
Qualifying draw

Singles